Peter Mason may refer to:
 Sir Peter Mason (businessman), English businessman
Peter Mason (politician), leader of Ealing London Borough Council since 2021
 Peter Mason (physicist) (1922–1987), English-born Australian physicist
 Peter Mason (bishop) (born 1943), Anglican bishop of Ontario, Canada